Odyssey is the fifth album by Norwegian jazz guitarist Terje Rypdal recorded in 1975 and released on the ECM label.

Reception
The Allmusic review by Michael P. Dawson awarded the album 4½ stars calling it "A  effort that combines crushingly powerful rock/jazz with long, brooding electric ruminations".

Track listing
All compositions by Terje Rypdal
 "Darkness Falls" - 3:33 
 "Midnite" - 16:45 
 "Adagio" - 13:16 
 "Better Off Without You" - 7:37 
 "Over Birkerot" - 4:48 
 "Fare Well" - 11:25 
 "Ballade" - 5:55
 "Rolling Stone" - 23:54 
Recorded at the Arne Bendiksen Studio in Oslo, Norway in August 1975

The album's first appearance on CD was in a single-disc version released in 1994 with "Rolling Stone" omitted. In 2012 ECM released a three-disc box set with the complete original track listing, plus Unfinished Highballs, a previously unreleased live recording from 1976.

Unfinished Highballs track listing:
 "Unfinished Highballs" - 3:52
 "The Golden Eye" - 14:04
 "Scarlet Mistress" - 12:25
 "Dawn" - 12:29
 "Dine and Dance to the Music of the Waves" - 11:40
 "Talking Back" - 7:10
 "Bright Lights Big City" - 6:15

Personnel
Terje Rypdal — guitar, synthesizer, soprano saxophone
Brynjulf Blix — organ
Torbjørn Sunde — trombone 
Sveinung Hovensjø — electric bass 
Svein Christiansen — drums

References

External links

ECM Records albums
Terje Rypdal albums
1975 albums
Albums produced by Manfred Eicher